Margaret Walker (2 January 1925 – 10 May 2016) was a British sprinter. She competed in the women's 200 metres at the 1948 Summer Olympics. She competed as part of Great Britain's 1948 Olympic 4 × 100 m relay team and they were placed fourth.

She also represented England and won a silver medal in the 660 yard relay and a bronze medal in the 4 x 440 yard relay at the 1950 British Empire Games in Auckland, New Zealand. She also competed in the 110 yards and 200 yards events.

References

External links
 

1925 births
2016 deaths
Athletes (track and field) at the 1948 Summer Olympics
British female sprinters
Olympic athletes of Great Britain
Place of birth missing
Commonwealth Games medallists in athletics
Commonwealth Games silver medallists for England
Commonwealth Games bronze medallists for England
Athletes (track and field) at the 1950 British Empire Games
Olympic female sprinters
Medallists at the 1950 British Empire Games